Shota Mishvelidze (born ) is a Georgian male weightlifter, and European Champion competing in the 62 kg category until 2018 and 61 kg starting in 2018 after the International Weightlifting Federation reorganized the categories. In 2021, he won the silver medal in the men's 61kg event at the 2021 World Weightlifting Championships held in Tashkent, Uzbekistan.

Career

World Championships
He competed at the 2017 World Weightlifting Championships in the 62 kg division, winning a bronze medal in the total. The competition was close as he was only 1 kg from the silver medalist Yoichi Itokazu and 2 kg from the gold medalist Francisco Mosquera.

European Championships
Mishvelidze competed at the men's 62 kg event at the 2018 European Weightlifting Championships in Bucharest, Romania, winning a silver medal in the snatch portion competition (134 kg), a gold medal in the clean and jerk portion (165 kg) and a gold medal for the total with (299 kg).

Major results

References

External links 
 

1994 births
Living people
People from Kutaisi
Male weightlifters from Georgia (country)
European Weightlifting Championships medalists
World Weightlifting Championships medalists
Weightlifters at the 2020 Summer Olympics
Olympic weightlifters of Georgia (country)
21st-century people from Georgia (country)